Tarache areli is a moth of the family Noctuidae first described by Herman Strecker in 1898. It is found in North America in Arizona, California, Colorado, Nevada, New Mexico, Texas, Utah, British Columbia and Mexico.

The length of the forewings is 10–12.5 mm for males and 10–12 mm for females. Adults are on wing from July to August depending on the location.

External links

Acontiinae
Moths of North America
Taxa named by Herman Strecker
Moths described in 1898